Jurong Entertainment Centre was an entertainment centre once located at Jurong East, Singapore.

Background
Opened in 1993, the shopping centre was within walking distance from Jurong East MRT station.

In 2000, the ground floor theatres were converted to a total of six theatres.

Redevelopment
The Jurong Entertainment Centre was acquired by CapitaMall Trust Management Limited for S$68 million in 2005.
It was closed for redevelopment in October 2008 and was expected to be completed by 2011.

The S$138.2 million asset enhancement work planned to house Singapore's first Olympic-size ice skating rink measuring 60m x 30m with a 460-seat gallery for spectators. Other asset enhancement includes a newly created floor where the present cineplex was relocated to. The retail space on all floors was also reconfigured so as to maximise the efficiency at the mall. In addition, a rooftop landscaped garden was constructed on the top level.

Demolition
However, due to the financial crisis of 2007–2008 and high construction costs, the redevelopment programme was delayed. The building was completely demolished in February 2010.

JCube

On 21 May 2010, CapitaMall Trust held a groundbreaking ceremony for its new mall on the site of the former Jurong Entertainment Centre.

The  new mall, named JCube, comprises five levels of retail, two basement levels of car park and a rooftop landscaped plaza. JCube started welcoming shoppers on 2 April 2012, and is managed by CapitaMalls Asia.

References

Demolished buildings and structures in Singapore
Buildings and structures demolished in 2010
Shopping malls in Singapore
Jurong East
1993 establishments in Singapore
2008 disestablishments in Singapore
Defunct shopping malls